Confessions of an Action Star  is an American action comedy mockumentary starring David Leitch, Angelina Jolie, Carrie-Anne Moss, Hugo Weaving, Eric Roberts, Dax Shepard, Debbie Allen, Lee Arenberg and directed by Brad Martin.  The film was titled Sledge: The Untold Story during its film festival run and is distributed by Vivendi Entertainment and Lightyear Entertainment.

Plot
A 'mockumentary' on the rise and fall of chippendale dancer turned martial arts action star, Francis Allen Sledgewick, AKA Frank Sledge. When fame and fortune caused Frank to lose his sense of what's truly important, he realised he's going to have to get in touch with his roots if there's ever going to be a comeback.

Cast
 Holmes Osborne as Richard Orchid (as Homes Osborne)
 David Leitch as Frank Sledge
 Nathan Lee Graham as Glen Jefferies 
 Kelly Hu as herself / Undercover Cop
 Carrie-Ann Moss as herself / Girlfriend in movie
 Ernie Hudson as himself / Commander
 Michael T. Weiss as Drug Lord (as Michael T. Wiess)
 Mitchell Gaylord as Brother (as Mitch Gaylord)
 Matt McColm as Commander
 Eric Roberts as himself / Police Chief
 Lin Shaye as Samantha Jones
 Kyle Reese as Young Frank #1 (as Kyle Reese Cook)
 Dax Shepard as SFX Coordinator
 Sean Michael Rabbit as Young Frank #2
 Chris Palermo as Russell Gold
 Michal Holub as John Hu (as Michael Holub)
 Josh Nathan as Will Stillwell
 Matthew Dickens as Agent #2
 Sam McMurray as Jack Rumpkin

References

External links
 
 
 
 IGN

2005 films
American comedy films
2005 comedy films
Films scored by Christopher Lennertz
2000s English-language films
2000s American films